Nasiruddin Khan ( – 10 October 2018) was an Indian politician from West Bengal belonging to All India Trinamool Congress. He was a legislator of the West Bengal Legislative Assembly. He was a minister of the Government of West Bengal too. His daughter-in-law Sahina Mumtaz Begum is the incumbent legislator of Naoda. He was known by the name of Montu Khan.

Biography
Khan was elected four times as a legislator of the West Bengal Legislative Assembly. He was elected from Naoda in 1969 as a Progressive Muslim League candidate. He was elected from Naoda as an independent candidate in 1971. He was appointed the Agriculture Minister of West Bengal in 1971. In 1972 he was elected from Naoda as an Indian Union Muslim League candidate. In 1991 he was elected from Naoda as an Indian National Congress candidate. He joined Trinamool Congress in 2001.

Khan died on 3 October 2018 at the age of 87.

References

1930s births
2018 deaths
Trinamool Congress politicians from West Bengal
Indian Union Muslim League politicians
Indian National Congress politicians from West Bengal
Independent politicians in India
People from Murshidabad district
West Bengal MLAs 1969–1971
West Bengal MLAs 1971–1972
West Bengal MLAs 1972–1977
West Bengal MLAs 1991–1996
State cabinet ministers of West Bengal